The Flaglor Scooter is an unusual light aircraft designed in the United States in the mid-1960s and marketed for homebuilding.

Design and development
The Scooter is a high-wing, wire-braced monoplane with the engine installed on the wing leading edge, above and in front of the pilot's seat. It features weled steel tube or wooden fuselage construction with fabric covering and short legged conventional landing gear. The wing uses wooden ribs and a dual spar construction with wire bracing.  It was originally intended to be powered by a  Cushman golf buggy engine, but this was found to be inadequate and a Huggins Volkswagen automotive engine conversion was used to replace it.

Operational history
Demonstrated at the 1967 EAA annual fly-in at Rockford, Illinois, the design won "Outstanding Ultralight" and "Outstanding Volkswagen-powered aircraft" awards. Plans were put on sale shortly thereafter.

Specifications (Scooter)

See also

References

 
 

1960s United States ultralight aircraft
Homebuilt aircraft
Aircraft first flown in 1967
High-wing aircraft
Single-engined tractor aircraft